Nenad Šimun, also known by his stage names Target or Mladi Gospar, is a Croatian rapper.

He began his career in 1994. He was first in a group called "Young Lordz" but they disbanded in 1996 and soon he and General Woo formed a duo called Tram 11. As part of Tram 11 he became one of the best Croatian rappers up until 2003 when he went solo. He is best known for his songs "Mokri snovi", "Ritam Grada", "Furam obleku" and "Stavi ovo na roštilj". He is the head of his own label WorkshopClass.

Discography
With Young Lordz
1995: Demo EP
1996: Wake Up

As part of Blackout Project
1996: Blackout Project - Project Imposible 
1998: Blackout Freestyle 98 cassette 
2000: Blackout 2000

With Tram 11
1996: Verbalator (DEMO TAPE)
1999: Čovječe ne ljuti se
2000: Vrućina gradskog asfalta
2003: Tajna crne kutije
2022: Jedan i jedan

With PR9 
2006:  Piratski radio 9 (demo EP)

Solo albums
2003: MC Demo
2005: The Album nastavak
2009: Još jedan dan u Zagrebu

Mixtapes
1998: WorkshopClass Volume 11
1999: Domačice
2000: Workshopclass volume 1
2000: Workshopclass volume 2
2006: 10 Yearz Of...
2007: Prva Petorka Mixtape
2010: Futuring Mixtape
2010: DSP All-Stars Pokradi Beat Mixtape
2012: Direkt
2012: Mladi Gospar Mixtape
2015: Verse Vs Verse
2017: Made in Cro

External links
 
  - two albums released under a major Croatian label

Living people
Musicians from Zagreb
Croatian rappers
Year of birth missing (living people)